Zebari may refer to:
Hoshyar Zebari (born 1953), Iraqi politician
Babaker Zebari, Kurdish politician and general
Gazi Zibari, (born 1955), professor of surgery 
Zabari, Iran (disambiguation)